Muati is an obscure local god in the Sumerian pantheon. He is associated in some texts with the mythical island paradise of Dilmun, and becomes syncretised with Nabu.

References 

Mesopotamian gods